Transtillaspis juxtarmata is a species of moth of the family Tortricidae. It is found in Peru.

The wingspan is about 21 mm. The ground colour of the forewings is creamish brown at the dorsum and in the posterior third of the wing. The remaining area is suffused brown. The markings are brown. The hindwings are cream, tinged with brownish and with brownish strigulation (finely streaked).

Etymology
The species name refers to the shape of the juxta and is derived from Latin armata (meaning armed).

References

Moths described in 2010
Transtillaspis
Taxa named by Józef Razowski